Conocarpus lancifolius, one of two species in the genus Conocarpus, is a tree in the family Combretaceae native to coastal and riverine areas of Somalia, Djibouti, and Yemen. It is found throughout the Horn of Africa, the Arabian peninsula, and South Asia.

The tree has no common name in English. In Somali, it is called qalab; in Arabic, the name is damas. It is also commonly found in residential compounds in Dubai.

Uses
The tree's wood is dense and suitable for charcoal. Goats use the young trees and shoots as fodder, although the leaves contain tannin. Because of its high salt tolerance and relative drought tolerance, the tree is sometimes planted as a pioneer species in reafforestation projects in its native habitat. The tree has a symmetrical growth habit and can easily be shaped into a variety of different forms. It can be shaped into short and tall hedges, and is effective for creating a visual or a noise barrier. With suitable plant spacing it can also be grown as a hardy single-stemmed tree which is good for shade. The tree has been extensively used in Karachi for landscaping along roads and by homeowners as a tall hedging tree for screening purposes. The tree thrives exceptionally well in the hot and dry climate of the city. The leaves of conocarpus lancifolius have an antidiabetic effect.

External links
Agroforestry in Kenya
IUCN Redlist of Threatened Species
Bamburi Nature Trail

lancifolius
Near threatened plants
Raza SA, Chaudhary AR, Mumtaz MW, Adnan A, Mukhtar H, Akhtar MT. Metabolite profiling and antidiabetic attributes of ultrasonicated leaf extracts of Conocarpus lancifolius. Asian Pacific Journal of Tropical Biomedicine. 2020 Aug 1;10(8):353.